Everton Souza Santos (born 2 April 1984), known simply as Everton or Everton Pedalada, is a Brazilian football midfielder who plays for Langkawi Glory United in the Malaysia M3 League.

Early life
Everton was born in Guarujá, and grew up supporting local side São Paulo, but came to also like rivals Santos, signing with them in 2001 as a youth player. He spent three years with the club, training with the first team in 2004, before leaving for a French third division side.

Club career
After time in the French third division, short spells at numerous clubs in Brazil, (including time with Cascavel in 2007, where he scored one goal) he joined Dubai CSC of the UAE Division One. However, he found out he would not be able to play for the UAE side and joined Bangladeshi side Brothers Union.

Everton was playing for Bangladeshi side Brothers Union in 2010, but left in 2011 for Sheik Jamal. He moved to the Maldives in 2012, and signed with Club All Youth Linkage.

He returned to Brazil to join Itumbiara in 2013, where he made 6 appearances. He then joined Maltese side Tarxien Rainbows, but was released in early January of the next year. Following his release, he signed for another Maltese club: the Zejtun Corinthians. He also played for UAE Arabian Gulf League side Hatta Club in 2014, notching up 11 games with one goal.

After his stint in Malta, and one appearance for Brazilian side Rio Verde, he returned to the Maldives with New Radiant in December 2014. However, he did not stay long, and was released in February 2015. In May 2015, he joined TC Sports Club.

He joined Sabah in June 2016 from Omani side Al-Mussanah.

Career statistics

Club

Notes

References

1984 births
Living people
Brazilian footballers
Brazilian expatriate footballers
Santos FC players
Mogi Mirim Esporte Clube players
FC Cascavel players
São José Esporte Clube players
Sheikh Jamal Dhanmondi Club players
Itumbiara Esporte Clube players
Tarxien Rainbows F.C. players
Hatta Club players
Esporte Clube Rio Verde players
Sabah F.C. (Malaysia) players
UAE First Division League players
Maltese Premier League players
Malaysia Premier League players
Association football midfielders
Brazilian expatriate sportspeople in the United Arab Emirates
Expatriate footballers in the United Arab Emirates
Expatriate footballers in Bangladesh
Expatriate footballers in the Maldives
Brazilian expatriate sportspeople in Malta
Expatriate footballers in Malta
Brazilian expatriate sportspeople in Oman
Expatriate footballers in Oman
Brazilian expatriate sportspeople in Malaysia
Expatriate footballers in Malaysia
Brothers Union players